Novosibirsk Lavrentyev Lyceum 130 — secondary school in Akademgorodok, Novosibirsk.

Location 
In 1959 school was situated in wooden building, in "Shya" district (Northern Akademgorodok), near the place where business-center "Pentagon" is situated nowadays.
In 1960 school was moved to 10, Detskij proezd. It was the first school building in Southern Akademgorodok. On the first floor there were school lessons, on the second and on the third floor there were lectures of Novosibirsk State University.
In 1961 another school building in Akademgorodok was built. There were no many classrooms in the first building, so it was decided to move the school to the new building.
In 1962 the main building of NSU was completed and the school returned to 10, Detskij Proezd.
Since 1970 school is situated in 10, Uchjonyh st.

History 
In 1959 school № 126 was founded in Novosibirsk Akademgorodok. 
During the first week of the first term school's number was changed to 130 and this number is current nowadays. There were 12 classes, 12 teachers and 206 pupils in school in 1959.
In 1962 — 63 there were some subjects in English, but this way of teaching turned out to be impracticable. It was quite hard for pupils to learn new information and new English vocabulary. By the end of the academic year british literature was the only English-thought subject.
In the same year first pupils graduated the school. There were two graduate classes with 17 tenth-grade pupils in each one.
In 1967 ICT lessons started. Pupils had lessons in Institute of Computational Mathematics, but in 1975 school got its own computer class. There were two teleprinters, which connected school with ICM.
In 1968 the first specialized classes in USSR (math-classes, natural-sciences-classes and humanitarian-sciences-classes) appeared in this school.
In 1997 the first school internet-class in Novosibirsk was opened here by George Soros.
In 2001 school got Mikhail Lavrentyev's name, and in 2002 it got the status of lyceum.

Directors' list

Photos

References

External links 
Old site (11.1998 — 09.2012)
New site

Education in Novosibirsk
Educational institutions established in 1959
Sovetsky District, Novosibirsk
1959 establishments in the Soviet Union
Schools in the Soviet Union